19th Street station is a subway station in Philadelphia. It is located underneath Market Street in Center City Philadelphia, and serves all routes of the SEPTA subway–surface trolley lines. The station was opened by the Philadelphia Transportation Company in 1907.

Touches of the original 1907 station, such as columns and railings, still remain. The station lies in the heart of Philadelphia's financial district, steps away from the Philadelphia Stock Exchange and two blocks north of Rittenhouse Square.

History 

The original line featured a bridge – located north of Market Street and south of Filbert Street – that carried both the subway and subway–surface lines over the Schuylkill River. The PRT bridge connected trolley lines in West Philadelphia to the underground subway–surface loop in Center City. 19th Street was originally the westernmost underground trolley station, as tracks rose up to an embankment west of the station to cross the PRT bridge.

The station was originally served by Subway Surface Routes 10, 11, 31, 34, 37 and 38.

Route 31 was removed from the subway in 1949 because PTC could no longer detour the line around the subway extension construction. Since Route 31’s routing was hit the most with line running on Market Street, PTC converted the line into a West Philadelphia Shuttle from 46th & Market Streets to 70th & Lansdowne until conversion to bus on June 19, 1956.

Route  37 replaced in subway by Elmwood Avenue’s Route 36 and absorb  it Westinghouse routing on November 6, 1955.

Route 38 was converted to bus on the same day the eastbound portion of the subway extension opened on October 15, 1955.

Route 13 was added to the subway surface tunnel on September 9, 1956  when Chestnut and Walnut Streets rail service was converted to bus on September 8, 1956. Route 13’s partner Route 42 did not receive the same treatment as Route 13 and simply converted to bus.

Route 36 replaced Route 37 in the subway surface tunnel on November 6, 1955.

Routes 10, 11 & 34 were simply rerouted into the new subway portals at 36th & Ludlow Streets (Route 10) and 40th Street & Woodland Avenue (Routes 11 & 34) on October 15, 1955.

Modernization 
Turnstiles were constructed on the westbound platform for the SEPTA Key fare collection system. As such, fares are paid prior to entering the turnstiles and not on the trolleys themselves as opposed to eastbound where riders must still pay upon entering the trolleys.

Station layout 
Similar to 22nd Street station, the station has two low-level side platforms with a total of four tracks.  The two inner tracks are used by Market–Frankford Line trains, which travel express between 15th Street and 30th Street.

References

External links 

19th Street Subway-Surface Trolley Line station (The Subway Nut)

Railway stations in the United States opened in 1907
1907 establishments in Pennsylvania
Railway stations in Philadelphia
SEPTA Subway–Surface Trolley Line stations
Railway stations located underground in Pennsylvania